The 1922 DePauw Tigers football team represented DePauw University during the 1922 college football season.  In James N. Ashmore's first season, the Tigers compiled a 4–3–2 record, and outscored their opponents 102 to 96.

Schedule

References

DePauw
DePauw Tigers football seasons
DePauw football